In ancient Celtic religion, Rudianos was a war god worshiped in Gaul. In Roman times he was equated with Mars.

He was invoked at Saint-Andéol-en-Quint and Rochefort-Samson (Drôme), and at Saint-Michel-de-Valbonne. The name "Rudianos" means 'red', reflecting the warlike nature of the god. At Saint-Michel-de-Valbonne there was also found a prehistoric image of a mounted war-god, dating to the 6th Century BC, who could perhaps be Rudianos himself. The menhir-shaped stone depicts a roughly incised figure of a horseman, with an enormous head, riding down five severed heads. The iconography is evocative of the head-hunting exploits of the Celts, who hung the heads of their battle victims from their saddles, according to classical writers.

References 

 Green, Miranda J., Dictionary of Celtic Myth and Legend, Thames and Hudson Ltd., (1997)

Gaulish gods
War gods